The Roman Catholic Diocese of Formosa 'Dioecesis Formosae' (erected 11 February 1957) is in Argentina and is a suffragan of the Archdiocese of Resistencia.

Bishops

Ordinaries
Raúl Marcelo Pacífico Scozzina, O.F.M. (1957–1978)
Dante Carlos Sandrelli (1978–1998)
José Vicente Conejero Gallego (1998– )

Coadjutor bishop
José Vicente Conejero Gallego (1996-1998)

Other priest of this diocese who became bishop
Adolfo Ramón Canecín, appointed Coadjutor Bishop of Goya in 2014

External links and references

Formosa
Formosa
Formosa
Formosa
Formosa, Argentina